Nuno Miguel de Magalhães Fonseca (born 30 January 1982 in Guimarães) is a Portuguese retired footballer who played as an attacking midfielder.

Football career
Earlier in his senior career, Fonseca was under contract to both FC Porto and S.C. Braga, but only represented its reserve sides. In 2005, he signed for Moreirense F.C. in the second division, suffering relegation at the end of the season.

After splitting the following years with Moreirense and F.C. Famalicão, Fonseca moved to Romania in June 2008, signing with AFC Progresul București in the second level. However, after a couple of months, he terminated his contract.

On 22 January of the following year, Fonseca joined PFC Lokomotiv Mezdra of Bulgaria on a three-year deal. He made his debut with his new club two days later, in a 6–0 friendly routing of FC Botev Krivodol, but appeared rarely throughout the campaign as the team finished in mid-table.

Fonseca returned home in the 2009 summer, signing with division three side Gondomar SC. After two seasons the 29-year-old moved abroad again, with G.D. Interclube in Angola.

External links

1982 births
Living people
Sportspeople from Guimarães
Portuguese footballers
Association football midfielders
Liga Portugal 2 players
Segunda Divisão players
Vitória S.C. players
FC Porto B players
C.F. União de Lamas players
S.C. Braga B players
Moreirense F.C. players
F.C. Famalicão players
Gondomar S.C. players
FC Progresul București players
First Professional Football League (Bulgaria) players
PFC Lokomotiv Mezdra players
Girabola players
G.D. Interclube players
Portugal youth international footballers
Portuguese expatriate footballers
Expatriate footballers in Romania
Expatriate footballers in Bulgaria
Expatriate footballers in Angola
Portuguese expatriate sportspeople in Bulgaria